Metrosideros humboldtiana is a species of plant in the family Myrtaceae. It is endemic to New Caledonia.

References

humboldtiana
Endemic flora of New Caledonia
Conservation dependent plants
Taxonomy articles created by Polbot